is the largest crater lake in Honshū island, Japan. Located on the border between Aomori and Akita prefectures, it lies 400 meters (1,800 ft) above sea level and is 327 m (1,073 ft) deep, drained by the Oirase river. With a surface area of 61.1 km², Towada is Japan's 12th largest lake, its bright blue color is due to its great depth. The lake is roughly circular, with two peninsulas extending from its southern shore approximately one-third into the center of the lake. The lake is a popular tourist destination.

Location
It forms part of the northern section of Towada-Hachimantai National Park

Geology
Lake Towada occupies the caldera of a stratovolcano still regarded as an active volcano. This volcano became active around 200,000 years ago, and through repeated eruptions and pyroclastic flows, especially 55,000 and 36,000 and 15,000 years ago, created an 11 kilometer diameter caldera with the proto-Lake Towada. From approximately 15,000 to 12,000 years ago, intermittent eruptions formed a small stratovolcano within this caldera (Mount Goshikiiwa). Intermediate eruptive activity continued and at least eight eruptions of magma occurred from 11,000 years ago to the present. The Ogurayama Lava Dome was formed approximately 7,600 years ago on the northeastern slope of the Goshikiiwa volcano. The Mikadoishi Lava Dome is estimated to be within 12,000 and 2,800 years ago. The collapse of these secondary lava domes approximately 5400 years ago give the lake its distinct shape and the inlet between its two peninsulas (called the “Nakaumi”) is the remnant of a secondary caldera which erupted and collapsed.

Hydrology
According to the National Institute for Environmental Studies of Japan, the water renewal cycle of Lake Towada is approximately 8.5 years. The lake area is fed by around seventy rivers, half of which are intermittent. The Oirase River, which drains towards the Pacific ocean, is the only outlet.

History
The name of the lake is believed to derive from the Ainu word  , literally meaning "rocky lake" 

According to a legendary account, the Yamata general Sakanoue Tamuramaro visited Lake Towada during one of his expeditions north to conquer the Emishi tribes, and built a small Shinto shrine on the  eastern shore of the Nakayama peninsula in 807 AD dedicated to Yamato Takeru. The mountain continued to erupt well into the historical period, with the last recorded eruption occurring in 915 AD in the Nakaumi caldera, devastating the surrounding area with pyroclastic flows and lahars, and covering most of the Tōhoku region of Japan with volcanic ash, leading to crop failures, climate change and famines.

During the Heian and  Kamakura Period, the area was a wilderness and a place of prayer and training for Yamabushi, including worship of Suijin, the kami of water,  as being associated with the azure dragon, legendary guardian of the lake, hence the other name of the sanctuary: Towadasan Seiryū daigongen.

The area around Lake Towada remained largely wilderness until towards the end of the Edo period, when the Nambu clan of Morioka Domain attempted large scale land reclamation projects at Sanbongihara (modern Towada) using the Oirase River for irrigation.  In 1903, largely through the efforts of Wainai Sadayuki, princess trout were introduced into Lake Towada. The lake now also has rainbow trout, cherry salmon, carp, Carassius, Japanese eel. The surrounding forests are temperate deciduous, and are primarily Erman’s birch and Siebold’s beech.

The lake was selected by the Tokyo Nichi Nichi Shimbun and Osaka Mainichi Shimbun as one of the Eight Scenic Views of Japan in 1927. In 1936, the lake and surrounding areas became part of Towada-Hachimantai National Park.

In 1953, in order to popularize the lake and the park, a sculpture of two women titled “The Maiden Statue” by Kōtarō Takamura was dedicated at the lakeshore as part of the park's 15th anniversary celebration. It was the last work by that noted sculptor.

A wartime Tachikawa Ki-54 aircraft of the Imperial Japanese Army Air Force which crashed in 1943 was found at the bottom of Lake Towada on 13 August 2010. It was recovered on September 5, 2012 and has been placed on  display.

Activities 
Located in the central area of Yasumiya is the lake's symbol, the Otome-no-Zo statue, located. From there excursion boats arrive and depart. In Utarube visitors can canoe or camp.

See also
List of Special Places of Scenic Beauty, Special Historic Sites and Special Natural Monuments
Tourism in Japan

References

Southerland, Mary and Britton, Dorothy. The National Parks of Japan. Kodansha International (1995).

External links 

 Towada - Japan Meteorological Agency 
  - Japan Meteorological Agency
 Towada - Geological Survey of Japan
 

Lakes of Japan
Calderas of Honshū
Volcanic crater lakes
Volcanoes of Aomori Prefecture
Tourist attractions in Aomori Prefecture
Special Places of Scenic Beauty
Landforms of Aomori Prefecture
Pleistocene calderas
Holocene calderas